Grant Aleksander Kunkowski (born August 6, 1960), better known as Grant Aleksander, is an American actor.

Early life
Aleksander was born in Baltimore, Maryland, and was the youngest of three brothers. He was well known at McDonogh School as both a football player and a thespian. He attended Washington and Lee University, but left to pursue his acting career. He eventually returned to the school and earned his Bachelor of Arts Degree in Theatre in 2012.

Career
The bulk of Aleksander's TV work has been in daytime dramas (soap operas). 

Aleksander is perhaps best known for his portrayal of Phillip Spaulding on the daytime drama Guiding Light. Aleksander played Phillip in several stints over a span of almost 30 years. His initial run was from 1982 to 1984. When Aleksander left the role, it was recast with actor John Bolger. Aleksander returned to Guiding Light in late 1986, leaving again in 1991, citing exhaustion from being front-burner five days a week for five years, as well as the loss of both of his parents in the early 1990s. Aleksander again returned to the show in April 1996, and Phillip was once again involved in front-burner story with ex-wife Beth, as well as new love interests Harley Cooper and Olivia Spencer.

The announcement in 2004 that Aleksander was let go by the show came as a shock; media reports speculated on a number of possible reasons, including Aleksander's high salary, and allegations that Aleksander was temperamental or had been feuding with the actress who portrayed his love interest. 

In terms of story, the character of Phillip appeared to be murdered on-screen, but a subsequent story the next year revealed that the character was alive.

In late 2008, it was announced by the official Guiding Light website that he would be reprising his role as Phillip Spaulding. Aleksander resumed the role on February 9, 2009, and played Phillip until the show ended in September 2009.

Aleksander also had a brief stint on Capitol for the 1986 season as dastardly DJ Phillips, and played Alec McIntyre on All My Children from 1993 to 1996.

Other roles 
Aleksander played the bartender at "Mickey's Bar" in the 1986 movie Tough Guys, starring Burt Lancaster and Kirk Douglas. In 2006, he appeared in two motion pictures, The Big Bad Swim and the American Civil War film Fields of Freedom.

He was also featured on several episodic television series, mostly in the 1980s and 1990s. His first appearance was in the ABC Afterschool Special, "A Very Delicate Matter". His guest starring roles include Who's the Boss? and The Fall Guy. Aleksander also played Nicholas Drake in the 1986 made-for-TV movie Dark Mansions.

Aleksander returned to Washington and Lee as a Guest Artist in the first "Dick Sessoms Honorary Production" of Shaw's "Mrs. Warren's Profession." He played Sir George Crofts, with Rob Mish directing.

Awards
Aleksander has been nominated for seven Soap Opera Digest Awards, winning one in 1999, for "Favorite New Couple", with Beth Ehlers, who played his former love interest, Harley Cooper. He has been nominated for three Daytime Emmy Awards, in 2003, 2004, and 2005 for Outstanding Lead Actor In A Drama Series.

Personal life

Aleksander is married to an attorney and former actress, Sherry Ramsey. They currently reside in New Jersey. He is a vegetarian and is known for his advocacy for animal rights. Aleksander is an active member of PETA. One of the instructional videos on the PETA website features Aleksander, warning people about the dangers of leaving an animal inside a car when temperatures are warm outside.

Filmography

Film

Television

References

External links

American male film actors
American male soap opera actors
People from New Jersey
Washington and Lee University alumni
Male actors from Baltimore
1960 births
Living people